Ernest Volk (August 25, 1845 – September 15, 1919) was a German-born archaeologist.  Volk came to the United States in 1867, and worked for Frederic Ward Putnam of the Peabody Museum of Archaeology and Ethnology for two decades, helping to add to the collection through excavations of Trenton, New Jersey.  In addition to his specimens at the Peabody Museum, Volk's contributions can also be found at the Field Museum of Natural History and the American Museum of Natural History, as well as at several universities.  Volk was a curator of a collection he compiled at the World's Columbian Exposition in 1893.

Along with his colleague Charles Conrad Abbott, Volk is best known for his 22-year investigation of early human occupation of the Delaware Valley.  Volk analyzed glacial deposits known as the Trenton Gravels, excavating the area using a form of archaeological stratigraphy.  Volk eventually published his research as  The Archaeology of the Delaware Valley (1911).

Volk died in Tunkhannock, Pennsylvania on September 17, 1919 in a car accident.

References

Bibliography
Volk, Ernest. (1911).  The Archaeology of the Delaware Valley.  Peabody Museum of Archaeology and Ethnology.  Papers 5.
Cleary, John J.  (1929) Journalism and Literature in Trenton.  Chapter XV. Trenton Historical Society.
Eggers, H. E. (Jan.-Mar., 1920). Anthropological Notes. American Anthropologist.  New Series, 22:1. pp. 97–99 
Lee Lyman, BR and J. O'Brien, Michael. (2006).  Measuring Time with Artifacts: A History of Methods in American Archaeology.  University of Nebraska Press. pp. 211–212.  

1845 births
1919 deaths
American archaeologists
People from Baden-Württemberg
People from Trenton, New Jersey
Road incident deaths in Pennsylvania